Alvin is an unincorporated community in Madison County, in the U.S. state of Georgia.

History
A post office called Alvin was established in 1895, and remained in operation until 1905. The community was located inland away from the railroads.

References

Unincorporated communities in Madison County, Georgia
Unincorporated communities in Georgia (U.S. state)